Gheorghe "Gică" Craioveanu (born 14 February 1968) is a Romanian retired footballer who played as a striker.

He spent most of his professional career in Spain–11 years out of 18–with Real Sociedad, Villarreal and Getafe, respectively, amassing totals of 330 matches and 70 goals in both major levels combined.

A Romanian international in the 1990s, Craioveanu represented the nation at the 1998 World Cup.

Club career
Craioveanu was born in Hunedoara, Transylvania. After playing for modest clubs, he reached Liga I in January 1991 (one month shy of his 23rd birthday) after signing with FC Universitatea Craiova. On 3 March he made his competition debut in a 0–1 away loss against FC Steaua București, but his team would eventually win the national championship with three goals from 13 appearances from the player; during his spell in Craiova, they never ranked lower than fourth and also won two domestic cups, while he was also crowned the league's top scorer in 1994 and 1995.

In summer 1995, after a combined 49 goals in his last two seasons at Universitatea, Craioveanu joined La Liga side Real Sociedad, netting 11 times in his first season to help the Basques finish in seventh position. Two years later he moved to Villarreal CF which were having their first top-tier experience, scoring a career-best – in Spain – 13 goals as they were immediately relegated.

Craioveanu was again a very important attacking unit – 38 games, eight goals – as Villarreal promoted the year after and, already a veteran, helped to the club's domestic consolidation. In 2002 the 34-year-old signed with Getafe CF of the second level, scoring 16 goals in 120 appearances over the course of four seasons and helping the Madrid team achieve a first ever top-flight promotion in his second year; he retired in June 2006, having appeared in 459 league matches during his professional career and scored a total of 131 goals.

International career
Craioveanu earned 25 caps for Romania, his debut coming on 8 September 1993 in a 4–0 win in the Faroe Islands for the 1994 FIFA World Cup qualification campaign. His only major tournament was the 1998 World Cup in France, where his output consisted of 33 minutes in the round of 16 0–1 defeat to Croatia.

International stats

Scores and results list Romania's goal tally first, score column indicates score after each Craioveanu goal.

Post-retirement
After retiring, Craioveanu settled in Getafe (the city of his last club) in Madrid's metropolitan area. During the local elections of 2007 he won a sports adviser seat on the local council, running as an independent with backing from the People's Party; this was the first suffrage during which Romanian citizens were eligible in other European Union counties, following Romania's European integration.

On 16 June 2007, as a result of a local alliance between the Spanish Socialist Workers' Party and Izquierda Unida, which took away PP's control over the Sports Adviser seat, Craioveanu convened with the PP not to hold a political office, and resigned from the council. He also worked as a co-presenter in La Sexta's football programme Minuto y Resultado, and a radio commentator on Onda Cero; after his first marriage ended in divorce, he remarried with a Spanish woman named Gemma, and eventually fathered two children, one from each union.

Personal life
Craioveanu's son, Alejandro, played youth football for Castellón de la Plana-based CD Drac as well as Villarreal.

Honours
CS Universitatea Craiova
Divizia A: 1990–91
Cupa României: 1990–91

FC Universitatea Craiova
Cupa României: 1992–93

Individual
Divizia A top scorer: 1993–94 (22 goals), 1994–95 (27 goals)

References

External links
 
 
 
 
 

1968 births
Living people
Sportspeople from Hunedoara
Romanian footballers
Association football forwards
Liga I players
Liga II players
FC Drobeta-Turnu Severin players
FC U Craiova 1948 players
La Liga players
Segunda División players
Real Sociedad footballers
Villarreal CF players
Getafe CF footballers
Romania international footballers
1998 FIFA World Cup players
Romanian expatriate footballers
Expatriate footballers in Spain
Romanian expatriate sportspeople in Spain